Mahmoud Abdul-Rauf (born Chris Wayne Jackson; March 9, 1969) is an American former professional basketball player. He played in the National Basketball Association (NBA) for nine years with the Denver Nuggets, Sacramento Kings and Vancouver Grizzlies.

Abdul-Rauf played college basketball for the LSU Tigers from 1988 to 1990 and was a consensus first-team All-American both seasons he played. He was chosen as the 3rd overall pick in the 1990 NBA draft by the Denver Nuggets. Abdul-Rauf was selected for the NBA Most Improved Player Award in 1993, appeared in the Slam Dunk Contest at the 1993 NBA All-Star Weekend, and was one of the league's most accurate free throw shooters. After his NBA career, he played in multiple leagues around the world.

Abdul-Rauf sparked controversy during his NBA career when he refused to stand for the national anthem in a sign of protest and called the flag of the United States a symbol of oppression.

Early life and career
Abdul-Rauf was born Chris Jackson in Gulfport, Mississippi, the son of Jacqueline Jackson. He was raised in a single-parent family, along with his two brothers, Omar and David. His childhood was characterized by poverty, as there were times when he and his brothers were not able to have proper nutrition. Abdul-Rauf missed the fourth grade and was later placed in special education classes. He had a moderate form of Tourette syndrome, a condition that went undiagnosed until he was 17. Abdul-Rauf managed to overcome difficulties to become a basketball prodigy for Gulfport High School. In his senior season in high school he averaged 29.9 points and 5.7 assists per game and was called up to the McDonald's All-American Game. He was also named Mississippi Mr. Basketball twice, in 1987 and 1988.

Having never played an organized game, Abdul-Rauf was discovered by a middle-school girls coach in Gulfport, MS during lunch period on the playground. Recognizing his skill, she convinced his mother to allow him to play organized basketball. In his first game, despite not knowing the rules, Abdul-Rauf scored 24 points. (Source: Beckett Publications)

College career
Abdul-Rauf was a standout freshman for LSU, scoring 48 points against Louisiana Tech in just his third game for the school. He set the scoring record for a freshman, with 53 points against Florida. On March 4, 1989, he scored 55 points against Ole Miss to top his personal best, while also setting a career-high for three-pointers made, with 10. In the same game, Ole Miss' Gerald Glass scored 53, making their 108 combined points the most ever by two players in an SEC game  He appeared in 32 games in his freshman season, setting the NCAA record for points by a freshman (965) and points per game by a freshman (30.2). He was named SEC Player of the Year and First-team All-American. In his sophomore season, he produced similar numbers with his scoring average slightly falling to 27.8 per game. On February 10, 1990, he tied his career-high for three-pointers made, while finishing the game with 49 points. He was named SEC Player of the Year and First-team All-American for a second year in a row. After a remarkable two-year stint at LSU, Abdul-Rauf declared for the NBA draft.

His #35 jersey was retired by the Tigers in 2020.

Professional career
Abdul-Rauf was selected with the third pick in the 1990 NBA draft by the Denver Nuggets. In his first season in the NBA he was named to the NBA All-Rookie Second Team. Despite the fact that he never dunked in an actual game, he participated in the 1993 NBA Slam Dunk Contest, after Nuggets president and general manager Bernie Bickerstaff sent NBA league officials a tape of Abdul-Rauf showcasing his dunking ability. Abdul-Rauf led the league in free throw percentage in the 1993–94 and 1995–96 seasons. His free throw percentage of .956 in 1993–94 is the third highest seasonal percentage in NBA history, behind Calvin Murphy (.958, 1980–81) and José Calderón (.981, 2008–09). He played with Denver until 1996, and was a key player on that team, winning the NBA Most Improved Player Award in 1993. In November 1995 he scored 30 points and a career-high 20 assists against the Phoenix Suns. On December 8, 1995, Abdul-Rauf posted a career-high 51 points against the Utah Jazz. In June 1996, he was traded to the Sacramento Kings for Sarunas Marciulionis and a second-round pick.

In 1998 Abdul-Rauf signed a two-year, $3.4 million contract with Fenerbahçe of the Turkish Basketball League. He left the club without finishing the season, stating he would retire from basketball due to loss of interest in the game. After not playing for the entire 1999–00 season, he signed with the Vancouver Grizzlies in August 2000. In December 2003 Abdul-Rauf signed with Ural Great of the Russian Basketball Super League. In 2004, he signed with Italian Serie A club Sedima Roseto. Averaging 18.4 points and 2.2 assists per game in the 2004–05 season he signed a contract with Udine in July 2005, but he sat out the entire season due to a torn achilles tendon. For the 2006–07 season, he came out of retirement for the third time in his career to play for Aris Thessaloniki. In November 2007 he signed a contract with Al-Ittihad of the Saudi Basketball League. In August 2009 he signed with Basketball Japan League team Kyoto Hannaryz. He averaged 17.9 points in 38 games in his first season in Japan. In July 2010, he re-signed with Kyoto Hannaryz for the 2010–11 season.

He is currently playing in the BIG3 basketball league for the 3 Headed Monsters. In 2018 he placed 5th in 3-point field goal percentage hitting them at a 45.5% clip.

NBA career statistics

Source:

Regular season 

|-
| align="left" | 1990–91
| align="left" | Denver
| 67 || 19 || 22.5 || .413 || .240 || .857 || 1.8 || 3.1 || .8 || .1 || 14.1
|-
| align="left" | 1991–92
| align="left" | Denver
| 81 || 11 || 19.0 || .421 || .330 || .870 || 1.4 || 2.4 || .5 || .0 || 10.3
|-
| align="left" | 1992–93
| align="left" | Denver
| 81 || 81 || 33.5 || .450 || .355 || .935 || 2.8 || 4.2 || 1.0 || .1 || 19.2
|-
| align="left" | 1993–94
| align="left" | Denver
| 80 || 78 || 32.7 || .460 || .316 ||bgcolor="CFECEC"| .956* || 2.1 || 4.5 || 1.0 || .1 || 18.0
|-
| align="left" | 1994–95
| align="left" | Denver
| 73 || 43 || 28.5 || .470 || .387 || .885 || 1.9 || 3.6 || 1.1 || .1 || 16.0
|-
| align="left" | 1995–96
| align="left" | Denver
| 57 || 53 || 35.6 || .434 || .392 ||bgcolor="CFECEC"| .930* || 2.4 || 6.8 || 1.1 || .1 || 19.2
|-
| align="left" | 1996–97
| align="left" | Sacramento
| 75 || 51 || 28.4 || .445 || .382 || .846 || 1.6 || 2.5 || .7 || .1 || 13.7
|-
| align="left" | 1997–98
| align="left" | Sacramento
| 31 || 0 || 17.1 || .377 || .161 || 1.000 || 1.2 || 1.9 || .5 || .0 || 7.3
|-
| align="left" | 2000–01
| align="left" | Vancouver
| 41 || 0 || 11.9 || .488 || .286 || .759 || .6 || 1.9 || .2 || .0 || 6.5
|- class="sortbottom"
| style="text-align:center;" colspan="2"| Career
| 586 || 336 || 26.7 || .442 || .354 || .905 || 1.9 || 3.5 || .8 || .1 || 14.6
|}

Playoffs 

|-
| align="left" | 1994
| align="left" | Denver
| 12 || 12 || 28.3 || .370 || .324 || .935 || 1.5 || 2.5 || .4 || .1 || 12.9
|-
| align="left" | 1995
| align="left" | Denver

| 3 || 2 || 25.3 || .364 || .167 || 1.000 || 1.7 || 1.7 || .7 || .0 || 13.3
|- class="sortbottom"
| style="text-align:center;" colspan="2"| Career
| 15 || 14 || 27.7 || .369 || .286 || .956 || 1.5 || 2.3 || .1 || .1 || 13.0
|}

Personal life
In 1991, he converted to Islam. He changed his name from Chris Jackson to Mahmoud Abdul-Rauf in 1993. He is the father of five children. Following his NBA career, Abdul-Rauf moved to Florida after his house in Necaise, Mississippi was burned to the ground in 2001. Investigators determined it was arson, and the FBI investigated, according to the Clarion-Ledger, but no one was ever charged. In December 2001, Abdul-Rauf appeared on an episode of HBO's "Real Sports" where he stated that the 9/11 terrorist attacks in the U.S. were an "inside job" and declared that he was sure Israel was involved in the attacks and had framed Al-Qaeda for them.

National anthem controversy

Abdul-Rauf is perhaps best known for the controversy created when he refused to stand for "The Star-Spangled Banner" before games, stating that the flag was a symbol of oppression and that the United States had a long history of tyranny. On March 12, 1996, the NBA suspended Abdul-Rauf for his refusal to stand, costing Abdul-Rauf $31,707 per missed game. Two days later, he worked out a compromise with the league, whereby he would stand during the playing of the national anthem but could close his eyes and look downward. He usually silently recited Islamic prayer during this time for those who are suffering from all walks of life and ethnic backgrounds.

In an apparent publicity stunt linked to this controversy, four employees of Denver's KBPI radio station were charged with misdemeanor offenses related to entering a Colorado mosque and playing "The Star-Spangled Banner" on a bugle and trumpet, in a response to Abdul-Rauf's refusal to stand for the national anthem.

See also

 SEC Player of the year winners
 List of NBA season free throw percentage leaders
 List of converts to Islam
 List of American Muslims

References

Further reading

External links 

Basketball-reference.com
By the Dawn's Early Light: Chris Jackson's Journey to Islam documentary film
BASKET ARIS Unofficial fans site dedicated to ARIS B.C.
"The Conversion of Chris Jackson," 5280, October 2007
Kyoto Hannaryz-Mahmoud Abdul-Rauf-  

NBA Legend Mahmoud Abdul Rauf Conversion Story

1969 births
Living people
African-American basketball players
African-American Muslims
All-American college men's basketball players
American expatriate basketball people in Canada
American expatriate basketball people in Greece
American expatriate basketball people in Italy
American expatriate basketball people in Japan
American expatriate basketball people in Russia
American expatriate basketball people in Saudi Arabia
American expatriate basketball people in Turkey
American men's basketball players
Aris B.C. players
Basketball players from Mississippi
Big3 players
Converts to Islam
Denver Nuggets draft picks
Denver Nuggets players
Fenerbahçe men's basketball players
Kyoto Hannaryz players
LSU Tigers basketball players
McDonald's High School All-Americans
Parade High School All-Americans (boys' basketball)
PBC Ural Great players
People with Tourette syndrome
Point guards
Sacramento Kings players
Shooting guards
Sportspeople from Gulfport, Mississippi
Vancouver Grizzlies players
21st-century African-American people
20th-century African-American sportspeople
American men's 3x3 basketball players
20th-century African-American people